Westfalia Rhynern is a German association football club from the district of Rhynern in the city of Hamm, Westphalia.

History
The club was established in 1935 as Turn- und Sportverein Rhynern, but disappeared after two years when, like many other clubs, it was caught up in the politically motivated sports policies of the Nazi regime. Following World War II, a group that included many of the club's pre-war membership reformed the club in 1946 as Sportverein Westfalia Rhynern.

The footballers advanced to the Verbandsliga Westfalen (V) in 1997 and two years later narrowly missed promotion to the Oberliga Westfalen (IV) when they finished just two points behind champions SC Herford. In 2002, the team slipped to the Landesliga Westfalen (VI) after losing a decisive match to Borussia Emsdetten. They immediately returned to fifth-tier play the next season and in 2006 finished as runners-up in the division. Westfalia captured the championship in 2010 and moved up to the NRW-Liga (V). Since 2012 the club has played in the tier-five Oberliga Westfalen except for one season in the Regionalliga West in 2017–18.

Current squad

Honours
The club's honours:
 Westfalenliga – Group 1
 Champions: 2010

Recent seasons
Recent seasons of the club:

References

External links
Official team site
Das deutsche Fußball-Archiv historical German domestic league tables 
fussballdaten.de

Football clubs in Germany
Association football clubs established in 1935
1935 establishments in Germany
Football clubs in North Rhine-Westphalia